John Heinz Cornelis Klunder (born 22 November 1940) was an Australian politician who represented the South Australian House of Assembly seats of Newland from 1977 to 1979 and 1982 to 1985 and Todd from 1985 to 1993 for the Labor Party.

Todd was abolished before the 1993 election and Klunder contested the new seat of Torrens but was defeated by Liberal candidate Joe Tiernan.

Klunder then retired from politics and did not contest the Torrens by-election when Tiernan died months later.

The by-election was won by ALP candidate Robyn Geraghty.

References

 

Members of the South Australian House of Assembly
1940 births
Living people
Australian Labor Party members of the Parliament of South Australia